Autumn Maze is a 1994 novel from Australian author Jon Cleary. It was the eleventh book featuring Sydney detective Scobie Malone and centers on the murder of the police minister's son.

References

External links
Autumn Maze at National Library of Australia

1994 Australian novels
Novels set in Sydney
HarperCollins books
William Morrow and Company books
Novels by Jon Cleary